John Lavery (1 March 1882 – 1926) was an English footballer who played in the Football League for Barnsley and Leeds City.

References

1882 births
1926 deaths
English footballers
Association football forwards
English Football League players
Jarrow F.C. players
Barnsley F.C. players
Denaby United F.C. players
Leeds City F.C. players
Swindon Town F.C. players
Gateshead A.F.C. players
Hebburn Argyle F.C. players